Preston Township is a township in Plymouth County, Iowa in the United States. The township is named after.

The elevation of Preston Township is listed as 1427 feet above mean sea level.

References

Townships in Iowa